Meri Jung Mera Faisla is a 2019 Indian Bhojpuri-language action romance drama film directed by Raju and produced by Manoj Kumar Chaudhary under banner of "Mithila Talkies Production" with association of "Aadi Shakti Entertainment". It stars Khesari Lal Yadav and Moon Moon Ghosh in the lead roles, while Awadhesh Mishra, Dev Singh, Subodh Seth, Sanjay Verma, Maya Yadav, Pappu Yadav, Manish Chaturvedi, Dileep Sinha and Rohit Singh " Matru" in supporting roles. Chandni Singh make a special appearance in this film with a song.

Cast
Khesari Lal Yadav as Kishan 
Moon Moon Ghosh 
Awadhesh Mishra as Govind
Dev Singh 
Subodh Seth as Rizwan
Maya Yadav as Kishan's Mother
Sanjay Verma
Dileep Sinha
Pappu Yadav
Rohit Singh "Matru"
Chandni Singh as special appearance
Glori Mahanta as special appearance in a song

Production
Principal photography for the film began in Mumbai on 18 July 2018. The film's directed by Raju and produced by Manoj Kumar Chaudhary. Chandni Singh's appearance will be seen in the film. The story is written by S.K.
Chauhan. In the film, Awadhesh Mishra will be seen in the lead role along with Khesari Lal Yadav and Moon Moon Ghosh. Singers are Khesari Lal Yadav and others. DOP is R. R. Prince. Fight done Eqbal Suleman and Art by Awadhesh Rai. Editing and Promo Editing done by Govind Dubey and Dilip Prasad respectively.

Music
Musicof Meri Jung Mera Faisla is composed by Madhukar Anand with lyrics penned by Pyare Lal Yadav, Sumit Chandravanshi, Azad Singh, Santosh Puri and Sandeep Sajan. It is produced under the "Wave Music", who also bought his satellite rights. Her first song "Jawani Sala Sute Akele" sung by Khesari Lal Yadav and Mamta Raut released on 10 June 2019 at same handle of trailer unveiled.

Track list

References

2010s Bhojpuri-language films
2019 films